Nadia is a female name. Variations include Nadja, Nadya, Nadine, Nadiya, and Nadiia. Most variations of the name are derived from Arabic, Slavic languages, or both.

In Slavic, names similar to Nadia mean "hope" in many Slavic languages: Ukrainian Nadiya (Надія, accent on the i), Belarusian Nadzieja (Надзея, accent on the e), and Old Polish Nadzieja, all of which are derived from Proto-Slavic *naděja, the first three from Old East Slavic. In Bulgarian and Russian, on the other hand, Nadia or Nadya (Надя, accent on first syllable) is the diminutive form of the full name Nadyezhda (Надежда), meaning "hope" and derived from Old Church Slavonic, which it entered as a translation of the Greek word ἐλπίς (Elpis), with the same meaning.

In Arabic, the name is Nadiyyah, meaning "tender" and "delicate." In the Dan language, the word Nãdienã simply  means "girl".

Notable people with the name Nadia include:

People

Architect
 Nadia Moreno Hernandez (born 1989), Mexican BIM Leader at ESJ

Academics
 Nadia Abu El Haj (born 1962), assistant professor at Barnard College
 Nadia Ghazzali (born 1961), Moroccan-Canadian statistician and university administrator
 Nadia Maftouni (born 1966), Iranian philosopher and artist
 Nadia Nurhussein (born 1974), American academic
 Nadia Rosenthal (born 1953), scientist who specializes in heart development related research
 Nadia Magnenat Thalmann (born 1946), computer graphics scientist and founder and head of MIRALab at the University of Geneva
 Nadia Zakamska, Russian-American astronomer and professor at Johns Hopkins University

Athletes
 Nadia Abdalá (born 1988), Mexican professional tennis player
 Nadia Echeverría Alam (born 1995), American-Venezuelan tennis player
 Nadia Báez (born 1989), Argentine Paralympic swimmer 
 Nadia Comăneci (born 1961), Romanian Olympic gold medal-winning gymnast
 Nadia Cortassa (born 1978), Italian triathlete
 Nadia Dandolo (born 1962), Italian long-distance runner
 Nadia Davy (born 1980), Jamaican sprinter
 Nadia Fezzani (swimmer), Libyan swimmer
 Nádia Gomes (born 1996), Portuguese footballer
 Nadia Nadim (born 1988), Afghan-Danish footballer 
 Nadia Petrova (born 1982), Russian tennis player
 Nadia Styger (born 1978), Swiss alpine skier

Actresses
 Nadia Bjorlin (born 1980), American actress
 Nadia Chambers (born 1968), Welsh actress
 Nadia Di Cello (born 1989), Argentine actress
 Nadia Farès (born 1973), French actress
 Nadia Khan (born 1979), Pakistani actress and presenter
 Nadia Litz (born 1976), Canadian actress
 Nadia Lun (born 1986), Miss Hong Kong 2008 contestant and actress
 Nadia Lutfi (1938–2020), Egyptian actress
 Nadia Sawalha (born 1964), English actress and television presenter

Musicians and singers
 Nadia Ali (singer) (born 1980), Pakistani-American singer-songwriter
 Nadia Almada (born 1977), Portuguese reality television star, winner of Big Brother UK
 Nadia Azzi (born 1998), American classical pianist of Lebanese-Japanese origin
 Nadia Batson, Trinidadian singer, songwriter, producer and model
 Nadia Boulanger (1887–1979), French composer, conductor, and teacher
 Nadia Krasteva, Bulgarian mezzo-soprano
 Nadia López (born 1983), Mexican singer and reality television star
 Nadia Malm (born 1986), Danish singer who collaborated with Svenstrup & Vendelboe
 Nadia Meikher (born 1982), Ukrainian singer-songwriter, actress, poet, television personality and fashion designer
 Nadia Mladjao (born 1979), French pop-soul singer better known by her stage name Imany
 Nadia Oh, English singer, rapper, producer and model
 Nadia Reid, New Zealand folk singer-songwriter
 Nadia Reisenberg (1904–1983), American pianist of Lithuanian birth
 Nadia Salerno-Sonnenberg (born 1961), Italian and American classical violinist and teacher
 Nadia Sirota, American viola player
 Nadia Turner (born 1977), contestant on American Idol season 4
 Nadia Zighem or Nâdiya (born 1973), French R&B singer of Algerian origin

Politicians
 Nadia Brédimas-Assimopoulos, Canadian politician
 Nadia Arop Dudi, (born 1971), South Sudanese politician
 Nadia Hashem (died 2023), Jordanian journalist and politician
 Nadia Makram Ebeid, Egyptian politician
 Nadia Ramassamy (born 1961), French politician from Réunion
 Nadia Savchenko, Ukrainian politician and former Army aviation pilot
 Nadia Valavani (born 1954), Greek politician
 Nadia Whittome (born 1996), British politician
 Nadia Zakhary, Egyptian politician

Writers and journalists
 Nadia al-Ghazzi (born 1935), Syrian lawyer and writer
 Nadia Al-Kokabany, Yemeni novelist, short story writer and academic
 Nadia Anjuman (1980–2005), poet from Afghanistan
 Nadia Brown, American poet, writer, and author
 Nadia Cavalera (born 1950), Italian novelist, poet and literary critic
 Nadia Chafik (born 1962), Moroccan novelist
 Nadia Davids (born 1977), award-winning South African writer
 Nadia Drake, science journalist who writes the No Place Like Home blog for National Geographic
 Nadia Fezzani, Canadian journalist/author; researches American serial killers
 Nadia Hashimi, pediatrician, novelist, and a Democratic congressional candidate
 Nadia Hijab, Palestinian political analyst, author and journalist
 Nadia Mitsopoulos, Australian journalist
 Nadia Muhsen (born 1965), British author
 Nadia Sharmeen (born 1986), Bangladeshi journalist
 Nadia Tueni (1935–1983), Lebanese-French poet, who authored of numerous volumes of poetry
 Nadia Wheatley, Australian writer whose work includes picture books, novels, biography and history; author of Five Times Dizzy

Other
 Nadia Bakhurji, Saudi interior designer who announced her candidacy in the 2005 Saudi elections
 Nadia Ferreira (born 1999), Paraguayan fashion model and beauty pageant titleholder
 Nadia Gamal (1937–1990), Egyptian dancer of Greek descent
 Nadia Giosia (born 1980), Canadian-Italian chef, comic actress and singer; presenter of Nadia G's Bitchin' Kitchen
 Nadia Heninger, American cryptographer
 Nadia Mejia (born 1995), American-Ecuadorian model and beauty pageant titleholder
 Nadia Murad, Yazidi-Iraqi human rights activist
 Nadia Tass (born 1956), Macedonian-Australian film director and producer
 Nadia Yanowsky, Spanish ballet dancer
 Nadia Yassine (born 1958), founder and head of the feminine branch of the Moroccan Islamist movement Al Adl Wa Al Ihssane
 Nadia Younes (1946–2003), Egyptian national who worked for the UN and the WHO, victim of the Canal Hotel bombing

Fictional characters 
 Nadia, Palestinian protagonist of the film A.K.A Nadia
 Nadia Chernyshevski, in Kim Stanley Robinson's Mars trilogy
 Nadia Fortune, in Skullgirls
 Nadia Godfrey, on the television series Hemlock Grove
 Nadia Jazeem, on the ABC television series Lost
 Nadia La Arwall, in the Nadia: The Secret of Blue Water anime directed by Hideaki Anno
 Nadia Petrova, Katherine's daughter on the CW television drama The Vampire Diaries
 Nadia Santos, on the television series Alias
 Nadia Vulvokov, in the television series Russian Doll
 Nadia Yassir, from the Fox television series 24
 Nadia McConnell, the sister of the protagonist from the musical Bare: A Pop Opera
 Princess Nadia (aka Marle), a character in the SNES/PS1 video game Chrono Trigger
 Nadia, in the American Pie film series
 Nadia, a Russian mail order bride in the 2002 film Birthday Girl
 Nadia, in the PC video game Command & Conquer: Red Alert
 Nadia, in the anime television series El Cazador de la Bruja
 Nadia, a stripper on the Showtime television series Dexter
 Nadia, a doll in the Groovy Girls doll line, by Manhattan Toy
 Nadia, in the 2002 computer-animated film Ice Age
 Nadia, in the Nickelodeon preschool animated television series Shimmer and Shine
 Nadia, in the 2009 film Pandorum
 Nadia, in the French animated series Titeuf
 Nadia, in the Disney Junior cartoon SuperKitties

See also
 Anadia (disambiguation)
 Nadezhda (disambiguation)
 Nadja (given name)
 Nada (given name)
 Slavic names
 Love
 Hugo (name)

References

Given names
Feminine given names
Albanian feminine given names
Arabic feminine given names
Armenian feminine given names
Azerbaijani feminine given names
Bangladeshi feminine given names
Bulgarian feminine given names
Circassian feminine given names
Croatian feminine given names
Czech feminine given names
English feminine given names
French feminine given names
Greek feminine given names
Hungarian feminine given names
Indian feminine given names
Irish feminine given names
Italian feminine given names
Lebanese feminine given names
Persian feminine given names
Polish feminine given names
Portuguese feminine given names
Romanian feminine given names
Russian feminine given names
Serbian feminine given names
Slavic feminine given names
Slovak feminine given names
Slovene feminine given names
Spanish feminine given names
Turkish feminine given names
Ukrainian feminine given names
Lists of people by given name